Kaveh Mehrabi (born 5 May 1982) is a former professional Iranian badminton player.

Career
Mehrabi was born in Tehran, Iran, and on April 10, 2003 he moved to Copenhagen, Denmark to become the first Iranian professional badminton player and practice at the International Badminton Academy.

Mehrabi participated at the 2008 Summer Olympics, and was defeated 2-0 in the first round. Mehrabi  participated at six BWF World Championships.

In November 2011 Mehrabi refused to play against Israeli Maccabiah Games champion Misha Zilberman. Ironically, Mehrabi was a member of the ‘Champions for Peace’ club, a group of 70 athletes committed to serving peace in the world through sport, created by Peace and Sport, a Monaco-based international organization.

Mehrabi was the Athletes' Commission Chairman (2008-2013) and a Council member of the Badminton World Federation (2010-2013). He graduated with physical education degree from the Azad University.

Achievements

BWF International Challenge/Series
Men's singles

 BWF International Series tournament
 BWF Future Series tournament

See also
Boycotts of Israel in individual sports

References

External links
Kaveh Mehrabi Official Website

Living people
1982 births
Sportspeople from Tehran
Islamic Azad University alumni
Iranian male badminton players
Olympic badminton players of Iran
Badminton players at the 2008 Summer Olympics